Vasile Puşcaşu (born 2 May 1956) is a retired heavyweight freestyle wrestler from Romania. He has competed at the 1980, 1984 and 1988 Olympics and won two medals: a gold in 1988 and a bronze in 1984. He also won two silver and four bronze medals at the world and European championships between 1977 and 1987.

References

External links
 

1956 births
Living people
Olympic wrestlers of Romania
Wrestlers at the 1980 Summer Olympics
Wrestlers at the 1984 Summer Olympics
Wrestlers at the 1988 Summer Olympics
Romanian male sport wrestlers
Olympic gold medalists for Romania
Olympic bronze medalists for Romania
Olympic medalists in wrestling
Medalists at the 1988 Summer Olympics
Medalists at the 1984 Summer Olympics
People from Bacău County
20th-century Romanian people